The England women's national squash team represents England in international squash team competitions, and is governed by England Squash & Racketball.

Since 1981, England has won seven World Squash Team Open titles. Their most recent title came in 2014.

Current team
 Laura Massaro
 Alison Waters
 Sarah-Jane Perry
 Victoria Lust

Results

World Team Squash Championships

See also
 Squash in England
 England Squash & Racketball
 World Team Squash Championships
 England men's national squash team

References

External links
 Team England

Squash teams
Women's national squash teams
Squash
Squash in England